Algeria (ALG) competed at the 2001 Mediterranean Games in Tunis, Tunisia.

Medal summary

Medal table

References

International Mediterranean Games Committee
Results

Nations at the 2001 Mediterranean Games
2001
Mediterranean Games